Ahome is a municipality on the coast of the Gulf of California in the northwestern part of the Mexican state of Sinaloa; it is adjacent to the southern border of Sonora state. It reported 388,344 inhabitants in the 2005 census. Ahome (population 10,840) is also the name of the second-largest community in the municipality. The municipal seat is the port city of Los Mochis, its largest community. It is the third most important municipality in the state of Sinaloa, and is a commercial corridor to the northwest of the country. It is situated on the Pacific coastal plain, at the entrance of the Gulf of California and lies in the heart of a rich agricultural region, Fort Valley.

Major communities 
Los Mochis (Municipal seat)
Ahome
Higuera de Zaragoza
Topolobampo
San Miguel Zapotitlán

Political subdivision 
Ahome Municipality is subdivided in 7 sindicaturas:
Central-Mochis
Topolobampo
Ahome 
Higuera de Zaragoza
El Guayabo
San Miguel
El Carrizo

History 
 1605 - Foundation of the town of Ahome, with the arrival of Jesuit missionaries led by Father Pérez de Ribas.
 1851 - Year of cholera, when the disease claims numerous lives in the region.
 1880 - Installation of a sugar refinery, a fundamental pillar of the future city.
 1901 - Opening of the Kansas City Mexico & Oriente Railway company in Topolobampo.
 1903 - Foundation of Los Mochis.
 1904 - Creation of the town of Ahome la Junta Separatista (Separatist Committee), which seeks separation from the municipality of El Fuerte (the Fort) and the creation of Ahome.
 1914 - Felipe Bachomo takes la Villa de Ahome (Village of Ahome) by violent force.
 1917 - La Villa de Ahome is designated municipal seat of the new municipality.
 1935 - The city council changes the municipal seat to Los Mochis.

Municipal presidents 
1948 - 1950: Francisco Ceballos - One of the best municipal presidents due to his contributions to the municipality, including the highway between Los Mochis and Ahome and between Los Mochis and Topolobampo
1951 - 1953: Samuel C. Castro
1954 - 1956: Armando Guerrero
1947 - 1959: Miguel León López
1960 - 1962: Antonio López Bojórquez
1963 - 1965: Alfonso Calderón Velarde
1966 - 1968: Canuto Ibarra Guerrero
1969 - 1971: Ernesto Ortegón
1972 - 1974: Nicanor Villareal
1975 - 1977: Oscar Monzón
1978 - 1980: Oscar Aguilar Pereira
1981 - 1983: Jaime Ibarra
1984 - 1986: Felipe Moreno Rosales
1987 - 1989: Ernesto Álvarez Nolasco
1990 - 1992: Ramón Ignacio Rodrigo Castro
1993 - 1995: Federico Careaga
1996 - 1998: Francisco López Brito
1999 - 2001: Esteban Valenzuela García
2002 - 2004: Mario López Valdez
2005 - 2007: Policarpo Infante Fierro
2008 - 2010: Esteban Valenzuela García

Climate 
The climate is mildly hot and humid, hardly modified by rainfall.  Studies have established the average annual temperature to be 33 °C (91.4 °F).  In the last twenty-eight years, the lowest recorded temperature was 5 °C (41 °F) and the highest was 43 °C (109.4 °F), the hottest months being from July to October and the coolest from November to February. In the period of reference, rainfall averaged 302.2 mm (11.9 inches) annually, with the rainiest months being from July to October.  The prevailing winds in the region are oriented in a southwesterly direction with an approximate speed of one meter per second (2.23 mph). Relative humidity averages between 65 and 75%.

References 

Link to tables of population data from Census of 2005 INEGI: Instituto Nacional de Estadística, Geografía e Informática
Sinaloa Enciclopedia de los Municipios de México

External links 
Municipio de Ahome Official website
http://www.sinaloa.gob.mx/conociendo/municipios/ahome.htm

Populated places in Sinaloa
Municipalities of Sinaloa
Populated places established in 1605
1605 establishments in New Spain